Mongolia competed at the 1984 Winter Olympics in Sarajevo, Yugoslavia.

Cross-country skiing

Men

Men's 4 × 10 km relay

References
 Official Olympic Reports
 Olympic Winter Games 1984, full results by sports-reference.com

Nations at the 1984 Winter Olympics
1984 Winter Olympics
Oly